(born October 4, 1968, in Saga) is a retired male freestyle swimmer from Japan. He represented his native country in three consecutive Summer Olympics, starting in 1984. His best Olympic result was the 5th place (3:49.91) in the Men's 4×100 metres Medley Relay event at the 1988 Summer Olympics, alongside Daichi Suzuki, Hironobu Nagahata and Hiroshi Miura.

References
 sports-reference

1968 births
Living people
Olympic swimmers of Japan
Swimmers at the 1984 Summer Olympics
Swimmers at the 1988 Summer Olympics
Swimmers at the 1992 Summer Olympics
People from Saga Prefecture
Asian Games medalists in swimming
Swimmers at the 1986 Asian Games
Japanese male freestyle swimmers
Asian Games gold medalists for Japan
Asian Games silver medalists for Japan
Medalists at the 1986 Asian Games
20th-century Japanese people